McKeyis a surname. Notable people with the name include:

David McKey (born 1954), basketball coach
Denis McKey (1910–1982), Australian rules footballer
Derrick McKey (born 1966), American basketball player
Willy Mckey (1980–2021), Venezuelan poet and writer
Alys McKey Bryant (1880–1954), American aviator

See also
McKee, surname